Riky Widianto (born 28 December 1991) is an Indonesian badminton player who specializes in doubles play.

Career 
Widianto career as a badminton player began in 2005 when Singapore Badminton Association (SBA) invited him to join the Singapore National Badminton Team while he was a member of Wima badminton club in Surabaya, Indonesia. He played in the open tournament under the Singapore flag although he was not a Singapore citizen. In 2009, he resigned from the national team and returned to Indonesia after he rejected an SBA proposal that he take citizenship, to be eligible to participate in the upcoming Southeast Asian Games, or return. Widianto and his family felt he was too young to change citizenship at age 17, and SBA did not wish to wait two years so that he could avoid the country's mandatory National service.

After returning to Indonesia, he resumed play for his old club, Wima, until the Badminton Association of Indonesia (PBSI) invited him to join the national team in 2010. His career has grown rapidly since, especially after coach Richard Mainaky paired him with Richi Puspita Dili.

Achievements

Southeast Asian Games 
Mixed doubles

Summer Universiade 
Mixed doubles

BWF Superseries (2 runners-up) 
The BWF Superseries, which was launched on 14 December 2006 and implemented in 2007, was a series of elite badminton tournaments, sanctioned by the Badminton World Federation (BWF). BWF Superseries levels were Superseries and Superseries Premier. A season of Superseries consisted of twelve tournaments around the world that had been introduced since 2011. Successful players were invited to the Superseries Finals, which were held at the end of each year.

Mixed doubles

  BWF Superseries Finals tournament
  BWF Superseries Premier tournament
  BWF Superseries tournament

BWF Grand Prix (3 titles, 4 runners-up) 
The BWF Grand Prix had two levels, the Grand Prix and Grand Prix Gold. It was a series of badminton tournaments sanctioned by the Badminton World Federation (BWF) and played between 2007 and 2017.

Mixed doubles

 BWF Grand Prix Gold tournament
 BWF Grand Prix tournament

BWF International Challenge/Satellite/Series (5 titles, 3 runners-up) 
Men's doubles

Mixed doubles

  BWF International Challenge tournament
  BWF International Series tournament

Other Tournaments 

Men's doubles

Mixed doubles

Performance timeline

Indonesian team 
 Senior level

Individual competitions 
 Senior level

References

External links 

1991 births
Living people
Sportspeople from Surabaya
Indonesian male badminton players
Competitors at the 2013 Southeast Asian Games
Competitors at the 2015 Southeast Asian Games
Southeast Asian Games gold medalists for Indonesia
Southeast Asian Games bronze medalists for Indonesia
Southeast Asian Games medalists in badminton
Universiade gold medalists for Indonesia
Universiade bronze medalists for Indonesia
Universiade medalists in badminton
Medalists at the 2011 Summer Universiade
Indonesian emigrants to Singapore
Singaporean male badminton players